From Every Stage is a double live album recorded by Joan Baez on tour in the summer of 1975. The first half of the album was acoustic, with Baez accompanying herself on her guitar, while the second half features electric backup.  Baez' recording of "Blowin' in the Wind" from this album was later included in the Forrest Gump soundtrack album. The song "Natalya" was dedicated to Russian poet and human rights activist Natalya Gorbanevskaya,

Track listing
Disc One
"Ain't Gonna Let Nobody Turn Me Around" (Traditional)
"Blessed Are..." (Joan Baez)
"Suzanne" (Leonard Cohen)
"Love Song to a Stranger, Part Two" (Joan Baez)
"I Shall Be Released" (Bob Dylan)
"Blowin' in the Wind" (Bob Dylan)
"Stewball" (Traditional)
"Natalya" (R. Apps, G.T. Moore, Shusha Guppy)
"The Ballad of Sacco and Vanzetti" (Joan Baez, Ennio Morricone) 
"Joe Hill" (Alfred Hayes, Earl Robinson)

Disc Two
"Love Is Just a Four-Letter Word" (Bob Dylan)
"Forever Young" (Bob Dylan)
"Diamonds & Rust" (Joan Baez)
"Boulder to Birmingham" (Emmylou Harris)
"Swing Low, Sweet Chariot" (Traditional)
"Oh Happy Day" (Edwin Hawkins)
"Please Come to Boston" (Dave Loggins)
"Lily, Rosemary and the Jack of Hearts" (Bob Dylan)
"The Night They Drove Old Dixie Down" (Robbie Robertson)
"Amazing Grace" (Traditional)

Personnel
Joan Baez – vocals, guitar
David Briggs – keyboards
Larry Carlton – guitar
Dan Ferguson – guitar
Jim Gordon – drums
James Jamerson – bass
Technical
Bernard Gelb - executive producer

Chart positions

References

Joan Baez live albums
1976 live albums
A&M Records live albums
Albums produced by David Kershenbaum